RRO may refer to:

 Rent Repayment Order, an order in the United Kingdom that allows a tenant or local authority to reclaim rent or housing benefit
 VR Class Rro, a type of narrow gauge locomotive
 Repeatable runout, see patterned media
 Radial run-out, see tire uniformity
 Waima language, by ISO 639 code
 Reproduction rights organisation, a type of performance rights organisation